Harriett Jay (2 September 1853 – 21 December 1932) was a British writer and playwright who often wrote under the pseudonym of Charles Marlowe. Several of her plays were turned into films. She is best known for her 1906 comedy play When Knights Were Bold.

Selected plays
 Alone in London (1892)
 When Knights Were Bold (1906)

References

Bibliography
 Nicoll, Alardyce (1973). English Drama, 1900–1930: The Beginnings of the Modern Period. Cambridge University Press.

External links
 
 Harriett Jay, aged 27, on the cover of The Illustrated Sporting & Dramatic News, 18 December 1880

1853 births
1932 deaths
British dramatists and playwrights
19th-century British novelists
20th-century British novelists